Khalil Dorsey (born March 31, 1998) is an American football cornerback for the Detroit Lions of the National Football League (NFL). He was signed by the Baltimore Ravens as an undrafted free agent in 2020 following his college football career at Northern Arizona.

College career

Professional career

Baltimore Ravens
Dorsey signed with the Baltimore Ravens as an undrafted free agent following the 2020 NFL Draft on May 5, 2020. He was waived during final roster cuts on September 5, 2020, and signed to the team's practice squad the next day. He was elevated to the active roster on September 28 for the team's week 3 game against the Kansas City Chiefs, and reverted to the practice squad after the game. He was elevated again on October 3 for the week 4 game against the Washington Football Team, and reverted to the practice squad again following the game. He was promoted to the active roster on October 9, 2020. He was placed on injured reserve on November 10, 2020. He was placed on the reserve/COVID-19 list by the team on November 28, 2020, and moved back to injured reserve three days later.

On August 16, 2021, Dorsey was placed on injured reserve.

During rehabilitation for his injuries, Dorsey has won praise for his volunteer work in the community.

New York Giants
On May 18, 2022, Dorsey signed with the New York Giants. He was waived on August 30, 2022.

Detroit Lions
On December 15, 2022, Dorsey was signed to the Detroit Lions practice squad. He signed a reserve/future contract on January 9, 2023.

References

External links
Baltimore Ravens bio
Northern Arizona Lumberjacks football bio

1998 births
Living people
People from Ontario, California
Players of American football from California
Sportspeople from San Bernardino County, California
American football cornerbacks
Northern Arizona Lumberjacks football players
Baltimore Ravens players
New York Giants players
Detroit Lions players